Ben Hancox is an English violinist most famous for co-founding the Sacconi String Quartet in 2001.

Pre-Sacconi life
Hancox started playing the violin at the age of four. In his late teens he studied with Serguei Fatkouline in Madrid and Bonn, before being accepted into the Royal College of Music. There he also studied with Felix Andrievsky. At the RCM, he won both major violin prizes, before leaving with a first class honours degree. In his postgraduate diploma, he was awarded a distinction in performance.

During his undergraduate studies, Hancox received the Emily English Scholarship, before then receiving the Associated Board for his postgraduate studies.

Founding the quartet

In 2001, Hancox founded the Sacconi Quartet along with its co-founders, Hannah Dawson, Robin Ashwell and Cara Berridge. The quartet started off playing in weddings, but rapidly grew as more and more people became aware of their existence.

Other work
As well as playing in the quartet, Hancox is also a very well known soloist, collaborating with many famous orchestras and artists.

References

 All information is taken from Hancox's profile at the Sacconi Quartet's official website.

Year of birth missing (living people)
Living people
English violinists
British male violinists
People educated at Simon Langton Grammar School for Boys
Musicians from Kent
21st-century violinists
21st-century British male musicians